Clínica Alemana de Santiago ["The German Hospital of Santiago"] is a Chilean private health care facility. It is located in the eastern sector of Santiago de Chile with three facilities: one on Avenida Vitacura (in the Vitacura neighborhood), one in Chicureo and the other in La Dehesa.

The German Hospital is affiliated with the German-Chilean Beneficence Corporation which was created in 2000 to replace the Beneficent Society of the German Hospital, created on 5 July 1905.

History 
The German community in Chile opened its first hospital in 1918, located in Davila street, in the current commune of Independencia. The building was sold to the Bank's Pension Fund 1970.

In March 1973 the current Clinica Alemana opened, located until today on Avenida Vitacura. In the following years it established itself as one of the first private health facilities in the country.

In 1999 a new medical center was built in the Clinica Alemana, located in the La Dehesa. In 2005 the construction of a new 16-storey building at its headquarters in Vitacura began. The building, designed to make diagnoses, was opened in 2006. Finally, in 2020, a third center was inaugurated in Chicureo, on the outskirts of Santiago.

References

External links 
 Clínica Alemana

Hospitals in Chile
Hospital buildings completed in 1973
1973 establishments in Chile
Hospital buildings completed in 2006